Velika Slevica (in older sources also Velika Slivica) is a village southwest of Velike Lašče in central Slovenia. The entire Municipality of Velike Lašče is part of the traditional region of Lower Carniola and is now included in the Central Slovenia Statistical Region.

Name
Velika Slevica was attested in historical sources as Zilowiz in 1230, Syloycz in 1335, Silewecz in 1346, and Czylowecz in 1436, among other spellings.

Church

The local church, built on a grassy slope above the village to the northwest, is dedicated to the Annunciation of Mary and belongs to the Parish of Velike Lašče. It was built in the last quarter of the 17th century.

References

External links

Velika Slevica on Geopedia

Populated places in the Municipality of Velike Lašče